The Bene Gesserit are a key social, religious, and political force in Frank Herbert's fictional Dune universe. The group is described as an exclusive sisterhood whose members train their bodies and minds through years of physical and mental conditioning to obtain superhuman powers and abilities that can seem magical to outsiders. The Bene Gesserit are focused on acquiring more power and influence to direct humanity on an enlightened path. Some of their fictional powers are analyzed and deconstructed from a real-world scientific perspective in the book The Science of Dune (2008).

The Bene Gesserit are primary characters in all of Frank Herbert's novels, as well as the prequels and sequels written by Brian Herbert and Kevin J. Anderson. They also feature prominently in the multiple adaptations of the Dune series: the 1984 film Dune; the 2000 TV miniseries Frank Herbert's Dune; and its 2003 sequel, Frank Herbert's Children of Dune; as well as the 2021 feature film Dune. A television series based on the Bene Gesserit, called Dune: The Sisterhood, was announced in 2019 for WarnerMedia's upcoming streaming service, HBO Max.

Anirul
A Bene Gesserit of Hidden Rank, Anirul is noted in Dune (1965) to be the deceased wife of the 81st Padishah Emperor Shaddam IV and the mother of his five daughters, the Princesses Irulan, Chalice, Wensicia, Josifa and Rugi. Anirul is referred to only three times in Herbert's 1965 novel Dune, and only once by name, but is a major character in the Prelude to Dune prequel trilogy (1999–2001) by Brian Herbert and Kevin J. Anderson.

In Dune: House Atreides (1999), Anirul is described as having "short bronze-brown hair," and it is said that her "features were long and narrow, giving her a doelike face, but her large eyes had a depth of millennia in them." In the novel, she is the Bene Gesserit Kwisatz Mother, the Reverend Mother chosen every generation to guide the Bene Gesserit breeding program. She calculates that the culmination of the program, the creation of a male superbeing called the Kwisatz Haderach, is imminent. This eventuality is contingent on a daughter of Baron Vladimir Harkonnen being bred with an Atreides male; the resulting daughter would then be bred with another Harkonnen heir, to produce the male Kwisatz Haderach. The Bene Gesserit Margot Fenring arranges for Anirul to marry Shaddam as a means for the Sisterhood to gain influence over the Imperial throne by ensuring that Shaddam will never have a son. During the events of Dune: House Corrino, Anirul is murdered by the Harkonnen Mentat Piter De Vries while trying to save the young Paul Atreides from being kidnapped.

Anteac

In God Emperor of Dune (1981), the Truthsayer Tertius Eileen Anteac comes to Arrakis in 13,725 A.G. with Luyseyal for an audience with the God Emperor Leto II that coincides with the Royal Festival held every ten years. They receive a message from Othwi Yake, Assistant to the Ixian Ambassador, that Face Dancers have infiltrated the Ixian Embassy, and are planning to assassinate Leto II.  They try to warn Leto, but the message does not reach his convoy in time; however, the plot fails, as Anteac and Luyseyal knew it would. They achieve little in their meeting with Leto II, and he takes the priceless vial of spice-essence with which they hoped to test his mortality.  He reminds Luyseyal of the lesson learned from past over-machined societies: "The devices themselves condition the users to employ each other the way they employ machines." Later, Leto enlists Anteac's aid in detecting the Face Dancers, who by that time have replaced everyone in the Ixian Embassy except the new Ambassador, Hwi Noree. In particular, Anteac identifies the duplicate of Yake, who has been killed and replicated since the original sent his warning to Anteac. Leto's chief minister Moneo Atreides suggests to the God Emperor that Anteac is a secret Mentat, a skill prohibited in the Empire by Leto himself; Leto agrees but says that it amuses him. Hwi shares her knowledge of the environment in which she was brought up with Anteac, who has been conscripted by Leto to lead a Fish Speaker assault on Ix, to wrest the secret of Hwi's origins. Anteac is shocked at the knowledge that Hwi is to marry Leto, and at the same time annoyed that her order had allowed so talented a woman as Hwi to pass through their training program without turning her into one of them.  With Anteac's faithful assistance, Leto's forces successfully invade Ix and capture Malky, but Anteac is killed.

Some 1,500 years later in Chapterhouse: Dune (1985), the Duncan Idaho ghola recalls his past incarnation from the time of Leto II, noting that he had met with Anteac on orders from the God Emperor to suppress the Mentat school the Bene Gesserit had hidden on Wallach IX. It is revealed that Bellonda is a descendant of Anteac's.

Bellonda

Bellonda is a Reverend Mother and the chief Mentat-Archivist counselor to Mother Superior Taraza in Heretics of Dune (1984).

After Taraza's death, Bellonda serves new Mother Superior Darwi Odrade in the same function in Chapterhouse: Dune (1985). During a conversation with the Duncan Idaho ghola it is revealed that Bellonda is a descendant of Anteac, an important Reverend Mother from the time of the God Emperor Leto II. Bellonda then retrieves the following information about the origins of Mentats from Other Memory:

In Hunters of Dune, the 2006 sequel to Chapterhouse Dune by Brian Herbert and Kevin J. Anderson, it is noted that Bellonda is one of the few Bene Gesserit with access to sensitive breeding records, and one of even fewer possessing the memories of all the Mothers Superior. Bellonda suspects that the Honored Matres had originally been Reverend Mothers sent out in the Scattering, and calculates that melange withdrawal and hypnosis had caused them to deny their origins. Thirteen years after the no-ship Ithaca escapes from the planet Chapterhouse, Bellonda is killed in a duel by her Spice Operations Director partner and nemesis, the former Honored Matre Doria. An outraged Mother Commander Murbella, leader of the merged New Sisterhood of Bene Gesserit and Honored Matres, forces Doria to share minds with Bellonda before her memories are lost forever.

Carlana
As Miles Teg is  being T-Probed by the Honored Matres in Frank Herbert's  Heretics of Dune (1984), he recalls the visit of an important member of the Bene Gesserit to his home in Lernaeus. Miles is left talking with one of the visitor's young acolytes, Carlana, who unsuccessfully tries her "fledging skills" on the eleven-year-old Teg. Miles, who has been well-instructed by his mother Janet Roxbrough, can easily see through Carlana and manipulates her in return. Carlana is described as having red-blond hair, a doll's face with green-gray eyes and upturned nose, and an "inflated view of her own attractions."

Chaola

Before the events of the Prelude to Dune prequel trilogy (1999–2001) by Brian Herbert and Kevin J. Anderson, Chaola Fenring (also known as Cirni) is lady-in-waiting to Habla, the fourth wife of Padishah Emperor Elrood Corrino IX, and serves as wet nurse to both her son Count Fenring and Crown Prince Shaddam. It is also hinted that Chaola may have secretly been a sister to Elrood. Chaola's son Hasimir proves to be a failure for the Bene Gesserit breeding program; as Paul Atreides himself notes in Dune (1965), "Fenring was one of the might-have-beens, an almost Kwisatz Haderach, crippled by a flaw in the genetic pattern — a eunuch, his talent concentrated into furtiveness and inner seclusion." Nonetheless, the bloodline manipulations of the Bene Gesserit produce a supremely intelligent and perceptive killer in Fenring, who later serves as Emperor Shaddam's chief counselor.

Chenoeh

As related in God Emperor of Dune (1981), Quintinius Violet Chenoeh, specially trained as an oral recorder, is sent (with Tawsuoko) by Syaksa to Arrakis on a fact-gathering mission in 13,725 A.G. She is invited to converse with the God Emperor himself, and he is uncharacteristically indulgent of her questions and somewhat generous with his own information, however cryptic.  Emperor Leto tells Chenoeh that he plans to restore "outward spiritual freedom" for mankind, and then refers to Siona Atreides as his "achievement" (which the Sisterhood correctly interprets as being related to Leto's own breeding program).  Leto then says, "You will return to your Superiors with my message, but these words keep secret for now. I will visit my rage upon your Sisterhood if you fail."  Chenoeh complies, following Syaksa's own warning: "You must do nothing which will bring down his wrath upon us."  Leto relates how he and his sister Ghanima were able to escape the disaster of Abomination, and also makes one of the earliest references to his secret journals, later found at Dar-es-Balat.  He knows he will ultimately be perceived as a tyrant, and wishes to preserve his "feelings and motives ... lest history distort them too much."  At the same time, he warns "Beware of the truth," and shares what he calls "the greatest mystery of all time" by which he composes his life: "The only past which endures lies wordlessly within you." Leto tells Chenoeh that by virtue of his taking her into his confidence, "You will become here an integral part of my myth. Our distant cousins will pray to you for intercession with me!"  He also foretells her later death during her attempt at becoming a Reverend Mother through the spice agony. Chenoeh's account of their secret conversation is found after her death, and it is later noted that "the persistent Cult of Sister Chenoeh assumes new significance because of the journals' disclosures." Chenoeh and Tawsuoko also bring back to Chapterhouse proof (in the form of a written eyewitness account of Leto's statement) that, as rumored, Leto executed nine historians in 12,333 A.G.

In Heretics of Dune (1984), she is quoted via epigraph:

Corysta

In the 2006 Brian Herbert/Kevin J. Anderson short story "Dune: Sea Child," Corysta is a Reverend Mother who, out of love for the child, would not hand over to the Sisterhood the baby they had tasked her to conceive. It is taken from her anyway, and as punishment, Corysta is banished to Buzzell to work in the operation harvesting valuable soostones. The Honored Matres later conquer the planet, enslaving the Bene Gesserit there. Corysta nurtures a foundling Phibian until it, too, is taken from her by the Matres when she refuses to tell them the secret location of Chapterhouse.

When Murbella's forces retake Buzzell in Hunters of Dune (2006), Murbella shares minds with Corysta, learning all she can about the situation on Buzzell but also experiencing Corysta's past. She recognizes Corysta's value and loyalty and puts her in charge of the soostone operation. Corysta manages to improve the efficiency and output of the operation, which is the Sisterhood's only source of revenue besides melange and is essential to their plan to amass arms for a final battle with the Unknown Enemy.

Doria

Ambition leads Doria, an Honored Matre, to reluctantly join the Bene Gesserit as Murbella hopes to unite the opposing organizations in Brian Herbert and Kevin J. Anderson's Hunters of Dune (2006).  Though Doria seeks to learn the  impressive skills of the Bene Gesserit, her Honored Matre impulsiveness and resistance to authority are difficult to shake. A chief advisor to Murbella, Doria is one of the few assimilated Honored Matres with access to sensitive Bene Gesserit breeding records. Doria and Bellonda are on opposite sides from the beginning; hoping to force them to at least respect each other's differences, Murbella makes them partners managing the spice operations on Chapterhouse. Thirteen years after the escape of the no-ship Ithaca, Doria kills Bellonda in a final confrontation. An outraged Murbella forces Doria to share minds with Bellonda, and makes her the sole Spice Operations Director. Six years later, driven to the brink of insanity by Bellonda's incessant chatter within her mind, Doria is eaten alive by a sandworm.

Dortujla

In Chapterhouse: Dune (1985), Dortujla is the head of the Sisterhood keep on Buzzell, having been sent to the cold aquatic planet years before as punishment for the so-called "Jessica crime" — a love affair, forbidden by the Bene Gesserit as a weakness that could compromise their performance.  Dortujla comes to Odrade at Chapterhouse, reporting that Handlers and their half-man/half-cat enslaved Futars have offered alliance against the Honored Matres, who have yet to make a move on Buzzell. Dortujla's Mentat analysis, however, suggests that the Handlers somehow intend dominance, and that the Matres intend to colonize Buzzell. Odrade sees an opportunity; she orders Dortujla to return to Buzzell and make contact with the Matres, brokering a meeting between Odrade and the Honored Matre leader (in which the Bene Gesserit will supposedly surrender) on Junction — the old Spacing Guild complex above Gammu — which the Matres control. Dortujla is tortured by the Honored Matres and forced to watch her party be murdered and fed to captive Futars; however, she witnesses a Futar using its immobilizing scream (which has "qualities of Voice") against the Matres.  Later, Dortujla accompanies Odrade, Tamalane and the acolyte Suipol to meet the Great Honored Matre Dama on Junction, as Miles Teg leads a force to attack Gammu. Dortujla and her party are eventually slain by the Honored Matres, but the Bene Gesserit conquest proves successful with Murbella left as leader to both the Bene Gesserit and the Honored Matres.

Farad'n

In Children of Dune (1976), Farad'n is the son of Princess Wensicia and grandson of Padishah Emperor Shaddam IV, trained in the Bene Gesserit ways by Lady Jessica.

Geasa
In Heretics of Dune (1984), the Duncan Idaho ghola remembers Luran Geasa, his first chief instructor.  She had become very attached to him, but had been sent away after allowing him to discover (at age eight) that he is a ghola.

Harishka

Harishka is the Mother Superior in the Prelude to Dune prequel trilogy (1999–2001), as the Sisterhood nears the fruition of its breeding program.

Hesterion

In Heretics of Dune (1984), Hesterion is Archivist counselor and advisor to Mother Superior Taraza and one of the few sisters with access to sensitive breeding records. Hesterion is the first advisor to suggest that the Tleilaxu ambition is to produce a complete prana-bindu mimic, and she is correct.

Iriel

Iriel is tasked to cultivate the Cult of Sheeana on Gammu; in Hunters of Dune (2006), she discovers the Honored Matre plan to send Obliterators on a Spacing Guild heighliner to destroy Chapterhouse.  She and some of her followers barely escape Gammu with their lives, but manage to reach Chapterhouse and warn Murbella in time.  Soon after, Iriel is killed in the Bene Gesserit takeover of Gammu.

Irulan

Princess Irulan is the eldest daughter of Padishah Emperor Shaddam IV and the Bene Gesserit Anirul. She becomes the consort of Paul Atreides in Dune (1965) as he deposes her father. Irulan is later one of Paul's advisors in Dune Messiah (1969), and a surrogate mother to his orphaned twin children in Children of Dune (1976).

Janess
Janess Idaho is the second eldest daughter of Murbella and Duncan Idaho, born a few minutes after her twin sister Rinya. In Hunters of Dune (2006), Janess and Rinya are prodigies: ambitious, impatient, and unquestionably talented, but Janess possesses just a hint more caution. Janess is obsessed with learning more about her father Duncan, and she often quotes his philosophical works. Rinya always has to be first for everything, and she demands to be allowed to undergo the spice agony, wanting to become a Reverend Mother at the age of 14, just like Sheeana had done. Janess tries to stop the ritual but Rinya insists; Rinya fails and dies. Janess later undergoes the agony herself at age 17 and is successful. Ranked as a lieutenant in the forces of the combined Bene Gesserit/Honored Matre New Sisterhood, her first military assignment is to exterminate a renegade Honored Matre group who control a portion of the planet Gammu. Janess is later promoted to Regimental Commandant, and adopts her father's last name.

Janet

Lady Janet Roxbrough is the mother of Supreme Bashar Miles Teg who had taught him the Bene Gesserit ways in his youth, prior to Heretics of Dune (1984).

Jessica

Lady Jessica is the concubine of Duke Leto Atreides and mother of Paul Atreides in Dune (1965). She returns to Arrakis in Children of Dune (1976), fearing that all is not well with her daughter Alia and the deceased Paul's twin children, Leto II and Ghanima.

Lucilla

Lucilla is an attractive young Reverend Mother and Imprinter sent to help train the latest Duncan Idaho ghola on Gammu in Heretics of Dune (1984). In Chapterhouse: Dune (1985) Lucilla manages to save the collective memories of the Sisterhood on Lampadas before the planet is destroyed by the Honored Matres, but is ultimately killed on Junction by the Honored Matre leader Dama.

Luyseyal

In God Emperor of Dune (1981), the Truthsayer Marcus Claire Luyseyal comes to Arrakis in 13,725 A.G. with Anteac for an audience with the God Emperor that coincides with the Royal Festival held every ten years. They receive a message from Othwi Yake, Assistant to the Ixian Ambassador, that Face Dancers have infiltrated the Ixian Embassy, and are planning to assassinate Leto II. Anteac and Luyseyal try to warn Leto, but the message does not reach his convoy in time; however, the plot fails, as Anteac and Luyseyal knew it would. They achieve little in their meeting with Leto II, and he takes the priceless vial of spice-essence with which they hoped to test his mortality.  He reminds Luyseyal of the lesson learned from past over-machined societies: "The devices themselves condition the users to employ each other the way they employ machines."

Margot

Lady Margot Fenring is the wife of Count Hasimir Fenring, close friend to Padishah Emperor Shaddam IV. In Dune (1965), Margot warns Lady Jessica about the threat to her son Paul Atreides, and later seduces Feyd-Rautha on orders from the Sisterhood to retrieve his genetic material through conception.

Miles Teg

Miles Teg is the former Supreme Bashar of the Bene Gesserit, pulled out of retirement in Heretics of Dune (1984) to help train the newest Duncan Idaho ghola. He is replaced by his own ghola in Chapterhouse: Dune (1985).

Mohiam

Gaius Helen Mohiam is a high-ranking Bene Gesserit who serves as Imperial Truthsayer to Padishah Emperor Shaddam IV in Dune (1965), and has an ill-fated visit with Paul Atreides on Arrakis in Dune Messiah (1969).

Murbella

Murbella is a young Honored Matre captured by the Bene Gesserit in Heretics of Dune (1984) and soon indoctrinated into the Sisterhood.  In Chapterhouse: Dune (1985), she kills the Honored Matre leader Logno as Bene Gesserit Mother Superior Darwi Odrade is killed, and manages to secure the leadership of both groups.

Odrade
Darwi Odrade is an Atreides descendant introduced in Heretics of Dune (1984). Secretly the daughter of Bene Gesserit Bashar Miles Teg, Odrade's "care with details" makes her  like her father  most suited for duties related to security. The younger Reverend Mother Lucilla is a near copy of Odrade from her physical appearance to the sound of her voice; however the two women are not directly related, but are instead the products of parallel breeding lines. Though trained by the Bene Gesserit from a young age, for the first few years of her life Odrade had been raised in secret on the seacoast of Gammu by a couple she called "Mama Sibia and Papa."  Odrade recalls this childhood fondly and treasures the lessons of love learned there, which she must keep forever secret from the Bene Gesserit, a "society where any form of love was suspect."

In Heretics of Dune, the "wild talents" of the Atreides bloodline that Odrade displays intermittently are what the Bene Gesserit both fear and desperately need. The suspicious  mainly Bellonda  scrutinize her continually, looking for reasons to terminate her, while Mother Superior Taraza senses that the Sisterhood needs Odrade's limited Atreides prescience to avert imminent destruction at the hands of the Honored Matres:

Taraza tasks Odrade to take over the Bene Gesserit Keep on the planet Arrakis, and take under her protection the foundling girl Sheeana, who has the ability to control the giant sandworms which roam the desert planet. Recognizing Sheeana's value to the Sisterhood, Odrade begins training her as a Bene Gesserit acolyte. Meanwhile, an anonymous document referred to as the Atreides Manifesto surfaces, attacking all religions in the known universe except for that of the Bene Tleilax. This creates a furor with the intensely religious Tleilaxu, who have long nursed dreams of hegemony, dominating the universe with their religion. The Tleilaxu council decides to treat the Manifesto as a gift from God, and they spread it far and wide. It is later revealed that the Manifesto was in fact written by Odrade. When Taraza is killed after a showdown with the Honored Matres on Arrakis, Odrade becomes Mother Superior.

In Chapterhouse Dune (1985), Odrade is accompanied by Tamalane, Dortujla and the acolyte Suipol to meet the Great Honored Matre Dama on Junction, as Miles Teg leads a force to attack Gammu. With Gammu about to fall, the Honored Matres activate their "weapon of last resort", turning victory into defeat and holding Odrade captive. Tamalane, Dortujla, and Suipol are killed.  As planned with Odrade previously, Murbella travels to Junction alone, pretending to have escaped the Bene Gesserit with their unique abilities and the location of the Bene Gesserit's hidden homeworld, Chapterhouse.  Murbella is brought before the new Great Honored Matre Logno, who has Odrade standing nearby unrestrained in a gesture of contempt. Murbella provokes and kills Logno, while simultaneously the Honored Matre Elpek kills Odrade. With both of these deaths, Murbella becomes the new Mother Superior as well as Great Honored Matre, fulfilling Odrade's intentions.

Ramallo

Ramallo is a Fremen Reverend Mother in the tribe who take in Paul Atreides and Lady Jessica after the Harkonnen attack in Dune (1965).

Raquella

Raquella Berto-Anirul (born 137 B.G.), granddaughter of Vorian Atreides and Karida Julan, is noted in the Brian Herbert/Kevin J. Anderson prequel trilogy Legends of Dune (2002–2004) to be the founder of the Bene Gesserit. During the events of Dune: The Battle of Corrin (2004), Raquella establishes the Humanities Medical Commission with fellow doctor (and her lover) Mohandas Suk in 107 B.G. after the burnout of a catastrophic virus (the Demon Scourge) genetically engineered and unleashed by the thinking machines to destroy humanity. In 88 B.G., Raquella travels to Rossak with Suk in their roles as doctors to help fight another outbreak of this plague. After being infected herself, Raquella makes a miraculous recovery due to "healing water" found on the planet. Paranoid and feeling that the doctor might somehow usurp her power, the leader of the Sorceresses of Rossak poisons Raquella with the Rossak Drug. Rather than killing her, the ordeal awakens Other Memory within Raquella.  Her body changed by her ordeal with the Scourge, she manages to internally convert the poison into a harmless substance, thus being the first to undergo what would later become the spice agony. Soon thereafter, Raquella also discovers the new ability to command others with Voice. She conceives a daughter with Suk, but remains on Rossak to continue her work as he pursues his goal to form the greatest medical school ever seen (later known as the Suk School). Raquella assumes authority over the Sorceresses and their breeding programs, and founds the Bene Gesserit school of thought.

Rebecca
Rebecca is a "wild" Reverend Mother discovered by Lucilla in Chapterhouse: Dune (1985).  Lucilla, fleeing the destruction of the planet Lampadas by the Honored Matres (and carrying the priceless shared-minds of all the planet's Reverend Mothers), is forced to land on Gammu.  Once there she seeks out a hidden settlement of Jews, whom she knows will give her sanctuary.  They are obligated to turn her over to the Honored Matres for their own survival, but before they do, Lucilla shares minds with Rebecca, transferring the knowledge of the "Lampadas horde."  Rebecca and the Jews eventually escape Gammu with the Bene Gesserit forces, and Rebecca is able to pass on the 7,622,014 Lampadas shared-minds to the Sisterhood.

In Hunters of Dune (2006), Rebecca is on the no-ship Ithaca when Sheeana and Duncan Idaho use it to make their escape from Chapterhouse. Rebecca later offers herself as a volunteer to become one of the axlotl tanks used to produce the important gholas of Paul Atreides, Leto II and others.

Rinya

Rinya is the eldest daughter of Murbella and Duncan Idaho, born a few minutes before her twin sister Janess. In Hunters of Dune (2006), Rinya and Janess are prodigies: ambitious, impatient, and unquestionably talented, but Janess possesses just a hint more caution. Janess is obsessed with learning more about her father Duncan, and she often quotes his philosophical works. Rinya always has to be first for everything, and she demands to be allowed to undergo the spice agony, wanting to become a Reverend Mother at the age of 14, just like Sheeana had done. Janess tries to stop the ritual but Rinya insists; Rinya fails and dies.

Sabanda

Sabanda is a young Reverend Mother in Chapterhouse: Dune (1984) who is captured and interrogated by the Great Honored Matre Dama on Junction.  Sabanda dies without revealing anything to the Honored Matres — except the fact that Sheeana is alive and, to Sabanda's amusement, the fact that Mother Superior Odrade calls the Matre leader "Spider Queen."

Schwangyu

In Heretics of Dune (1984), Schwangyu is in charge of the Duncan Idaho ghola project on Gammu.  As the leader of a faction of the Sisterhood who believe that such gholas are a danger to the order and its goals, she has been subtly encouraging the ghola's failure.  By the time Lucilla arrives to teach Idaho and bind his loyalty to the Sisterhood with sexual imprinting, he has already been tarnished by Schwangyu and nurses hate for the Bene Gesserit, hoping to escape their control of his life.  Despite Schwangyu's efforts to seduce Lucilla to her side, Idaho blossoms under the training of Lucilla (and Miles Teg), and Schwangyu begins to realize that she has much underestimated Lucilla. She betrays Teg, Lucilla, and Idaho to the Tleilaxu, allowing them to attack the keep on Gammu where Idaho is being trained, but the Tleilaxu forces kill her during the strike.

Sheeana

Sheeana Brugh is a young girl native to the planet Rakis whose unique ability to control sandworms is revealed after her impoverished village is wiped out by one in Heretics of Dune (1984). The giant creature refuses to harm her, then whisks her to the capital city of Keen when she climbs on to its back in the long-forbidden Fremen tradition. Sheeana is soon recognized as the "sandrider" predicted by the God Emperor Leto II, and worshipped by the priesthood of Rakis. As she matures to adulthood, Sheeana effectively assumes control of the priesthood; her popularity and religious aura have increased both on and off Rakis, and the priests, believing her a prophet, are compelled to follow even her most unorthodox commands. The Bene Gesserit — who have their own plans for Sheeana and have secretly guided her education — thwart an assassination attempt on her, and unofficially take control of Sheeana, the priesthood, and Rakis. Reverend Mother Darwi Odrade begins Sheeana's formal Bene Gesserit training, and Mother Superior Taraza is soon pleased with Sheeana's progress, and considers a secondary plan of seeding other planets with sandworms with Sheeana's help.

Rakis itself is destroyed by the Honored Matres at the end of Heretics of Dune; in  Chapterhouse: Dune (1985), Sheeana is now in charge of the project to breed sandworms on the Bene Gesserit world Chapterhouse. She becomes a full Reverend Mother but remains very independent, with mysterious depths. Disagreeing with the plans of new Bene Gesserit leader Murbella, at the end of Chapterhouse Dune Sheeana chooses to escape Chapterhouse on a no-ship with the Duncan Idaho ghola.

In Hunters of Dune, the 2006 sequel to Chapterhouse Dune by Brian Herbert and Kevin J. Anderson, Sheeana and Duncan lead the no-ship in their journey to flee the Unknown Enemy that pursues them. Sheeana decides that they need to make new gholas of former heroes using the genetic material carried by the last Tleilaxu Master Scytale. The story concludes in Sandworms of Dune (2007).

Suipol

In Chapterhouse: Dune (1985), Suipol is an acolyte chosen to serve and accompany Odrade on her voyage with Tamalane and Dortujla to meet the Great Honored Matre Dama on Junction, as Miles Teg leads a force to attack Gammu. Odrade describes her as a "dark little thing with a round, calm face and manners to match. Not one of our brightest but guaranteed efficient." However, after interaction with Suipol, Odrade realizes that she is much more capable than anticipated and judges her ready to undertake the spice agony and become a full Reverend Mother. Suipol and her party are eventually slain by the Honored Matres, but the Bene Gesserit conquest proves successful with Murbella left as leader to both the Bene Gesserit and the Honored Matres. Odrade is upset by the Suipol's death, lamenting the fact that the young acolyte died without being able to share her memories with another sister.

Syaksa

As related in God Emperor of Dune (1981), Syaksa sends Chenoeh and Tawsuoko to Arrakis on a fact-gathering mission in 13,725 A.G. Her warning to Chenoeh that "You must do nothing which will bring down his wrath upon us" encourages Chenoeh to obey the God Emperor's command to withhold certain of his statements from the Sisterhood. Syaksa and four other Reverend Mothers (Yitob, Mamulut, Eknekosk and Akeli) incorporate information gleaned from this mission into an "assessment  of the state of the Empire" for that year (before the subsequent assassination of Leto II).  Syaksa believes that the religious character of the Fish Speakers is slowly being devolved under Leto II.  She further attributes to him a motive based on the concept of hydraulic despotism, in which a government structure maintains power and control through exclusive control over a basic resource needed to live (in this case, melange), proposing that he is building the Empire toward an even greater dependence on the spice.

Tamalane

Tamalane is one of the Duncan Idaho ghola's first chief instructors on Gammu in the events before Heretics of Dune (1984). Tamalane is one of Mother Superior Darwi Odrade's advisors in Chapterhouse: Dune (1985), and accompanies Odrade, Dortujla and the acolyte Suipol to meet the Great Honored Matre Dama on Junction as Miles Teg leads a force to attack Gammu. Tamalane and her party are eventually slain by the Honored Matres, but the Bene Gesserit conquest proves successful with Murbella left as leader to both the Bene Gesserit and the Honored Matres.

Tanidia
In Children of Dune (1976), Tanidia Nerus is briefly mentioned as being mother of the Lady Jessica through her mating with Baron Vladimir Harkonnen. The prequel novel Dune: House Harkonnen (2000) establishes this as an alias of Mohiam.

Taraza

Alma Mavis Taraza is the Mother Superior in Heretics of Dune (1984) who brings Bashar Miles Teg reluctantly out of retirement to guard the latest Duncan Idaho ghola. Taraza blackmails Tleilaxu Master Waff to find out all he knows about the new threat to the Old Empire known as the Honored Matres, as well as the fact that the Bene Tleilax have included their own agenda within the ghola. She also manages to divine that Waff is a secret Zensufi, which finally gives the Sisterhood a way to manipulate the Tleilaxu.  Assigned to take command of the outpost on Rakis by Taraza, Odrade makes an alliance with Waff using this very knowledge of his religious beliefs. This alliance plays into Taraza's master plan: to destroy Rakis and free humanity from Leto II's own plan. An alliance with the Tleilaxu, the only remaining source of melange, would be essential after such a scenario. Taraza then considers a secondary plan of seeding other planets with sandworms with the help of the "sandrider" — a girl named Sheeana who has the power to control the worms.  But when the Honored Matres finally attack Rakis, Taraza is killed with the first attack, cut down by lasguns. Luckily, Odrade has time to share Other Memory with Taraza before escaping with Sheeana into the desert on a worm.

Tawsuoko

As related in God Emperor of Dune (1981), Tawsuoko is sent (with Chenoeh) by Syaksa to Arrakis on a fact-gathering mission in 13,725 A.G. In addition to the record of Chenoeh's somewhat enlightening conversations with the God Emperor, she and Chenoeh bring back to Chapter House proof (in the form of a written eyewitness account of Lord Leto's statement) that, as rumored, Leto executed nine historians in 12,333 A.G.

Tessia

In the Prelude to Dune series (1999–2001), Tessia is the Bene Gesserit wife of Prince Rhombur Vernius of Ix. Though she is sent to him by the Sisterhood, any possible agenda involving the Prince and House Vernius is never revealed; even Lady Jessica cannot determine if Tessia has any ulterior motives.

Wanna

Wanna Marcus (born 10,092 A.G.), is the Bene Gesserit wife of Suk doctor Wellington Yueh. Immediately prior to the events transpiring in Dune (1965), she is kidnapped by the Baron Vladimir Harkonnen, who uses the threat of her extended torture to subvert Yueh's Suk Imperial Conditioning (which normally prohibits him from doing harm) and coerce him to betray Duke Leto Atreides. Yueh gives in to the Baron's demands, but twists the letter of his orders and tries to kill Harkonnen with the unwitting help of Leto, an attempt that ultimately fails. Yueh discovers (as he suspected) that Wanna had already been killed, and is murdered himself by the Baron's twisted Mentat, Piter De Vries. However, Yueh's loyalty to the Atreides had prompted him to aid the successful escape of Paul Atreides and Lady Jessica into the desert.

In the Prelude to Dune prequel trilogy (1999–2001) by Brian Herbert and Kevin J. Anderson, it is revealed that Wanna had been instructed by the Sisterhood not to bear Yueh any children. She had told him she was infertile due to an industrial accident.

A ghola of Yueh is created in Hunters of Dune, the 2006 first installment of the Herbert/Anderson finale of the original series. In its 2007 sequel, Sandworms of Dune (2007), the Bene Gesserit Sheeana subjects Yueh to an intense personal trauma to restore his original memories; he recalls how Piter De Vries and Baron Harkonnen had broken the Suk conditioning by repeatedly forcing him to watch Wanna be systematically tortured and humiliated.

Notes

References